Hamza Kattan (born 19 April 1997) is a Jordan taekwondo practitioner. In 2019, he won a bronze medal in the men's heavyweight (87+ kg) event at the 2019 World Taekwondo Championships held in Manchester, United Kingdom.

At the 2018 Asian Games held in Jakarta, Indonesia, he won one of the bronze medals in the men's +80 kg event.

References

External links 

 

Living people
Place of birth missing (living people)
Jordanian male taekwondo practitioners
Taekwondo practitioners at the 2018 Asian Games
Medalists at the 2018 Asian Games
Asian Games bronze medalists for Jordan
Asian Games medalists in taekwondo
World Taekwondo Championships medalists
Islamic Solidarity Games competitors for Jordan
21st-century Jordanian people
1997 births